This is a list of seasons completed by the UConn Huskies men's ice hockey team, representing the University of Connecticut in NCAA Division I men's hockey.  The list documents the season-by-season records of the Huskies from 1960 to present, including postseason records, and league awards for individual players or head coaches.

UConn has won one conference tournament championship since establishing the program in 1960.  The Huskies began Division I play in 1998 as a member of the Metro Atlantic Athletic Conference, which became known as Atlantic Hockey in 2003.  The Huskies began competition in Hockey East in 2014.

Season-by-season results
Note: GP = Games played, W = Wins, L = Losses, T = Ties

* Winning percentage is used when conference schedules are unbalanced.† Bruce Marshall took a medical leave of absence in November of 2012.

References

 
Connecticut
UConn Huskies ice hockey seasons